Ladipo Ayodeji Banjo,  (Born 2 May 1934) is a Nigerian Emeritus professor of English language, educational administrator, former Vice-Chancellor of the University of Ibadan, Nigeria as well as former pro-chancellor of Ajayi Crowther University.

Education 
Ladipo was born in May 1934, in Oyo State Nigeria to the family of Reverend Ayodeji Banjo.
He attended St. Andrews Anglican primary school and Christ Cathedral primary school in Lagos state, Nigeria. He attended Igbobi college in Lagos State,  Nigeria between 1947 and 1952.
In 1966, he won the American State Department scholarship award for a Master of Art (M.A) degree in linguistics at the University of California, Los Angeles, United States.
He later obtained a Doctorate degree (P.hD) in 1969 from the University of Ibadan, Nigeria.

Career
He began his career as a lecturer at the department of English language, University of Ibadan in 1966. He was appointed associate professor in 1973 and became a full professor in 1975 at the University of Ibadan, Nigeria.
In 1981, he became the vice chancellor of the University of Ibadan.
He was appointed vice chancellor of the University of Ibadan in 1984, a position he held till 1991. During this period, he was the chairman committee of vice chancellor of Nigerian universities. 
He served as visiting professor for one year at the University of West Indies at Cave Hill as well as visiting fellow at the University of Cambridge, England between 1993 and 1994.
He was appointed as the pro-chancellor of the University of Port Harcourt between 2000 and 2004. After his tenure he was appointed as pro-chancellor of the University of Ilorin for two years (2005-2007). He also served as the incumbent pro-chancellor of Ajayi Crowther University.

Awards and honours
Justice of Peace (JP), Oyo State (1984)
Commander of the Order of Niger, CON (2001)
Literature honori causa, Port Harcourt (2005)
Nigeria National Order of Merit, NNOM (2009)

Membership of professional bodies
President, Nigeria Academy of Letters (2000-2004)
Fellow Nigeria Academy of Letters (2000-2004)
 Chairman, Sigma Foundation (2005-2010)
Fellow of the Nigeria English Studies Association (2006)

See also
List of vice chancellors in Nigeria
University of Ibadan

References

1934 births
Living people
People from Oyo State
Igbobi College alumni
Alumni of the University of Glasgow
University of California, Los Angeles alumni
University of Ibadan alumni
Academic staff of the University of Ibadan
Academic staff of the University of Port Harcourt
Academic staff of the University of Ilorin
Vice-Chancellors of the University of Ibadan
20th-century Nigerian educators
21st-century Nigerian educators
Educators from Ibadan